Santa Maria della Vittoria (St Mary of the Victory) is the name of several churches in Italy:
The Basilica of Santa Maria della Vittoria, Rome
Santa Maria della Vittoria, Mantua
Santa Maria della Vittoria, Scurcola Marsicana
Nuragic sanctuary of Santa Vittoria in Serri, Sardinia
Santa Maria della Vittoria, San Vito dei Normanni, Apulia
Santa Maria della Vittoria (Lucera Cathedral)